This is a complete list of members of the United States Senate during the 107th United States Congress listed by seniority, from January 3, 2001, to January 3, 2003.

Order of service is based on the commencement of the senator's first term. Behind this is former service as a U.S. senator (only giving the senator seniority within his or her new incoming class), service as U.S. Vice President, a House member, a cabinet secretary, a state governor, and then by their state's population, respectively.

In this congress, Ernest Hollings (D-South Carolina) was the most senior junior senator and Chuck Schumer (D-New York) was the most junior senior senator until Paul Wellstone's death from a plane crash on October 25, 2002, Mark Dayton (D-Minnesota) took this distinction until the end of the congress.

Senators who were sworn in during the middle of the two-year congressional term (up until the last senator who was not sworn in early after winning the November 2002 election) are listed at the end of the list with no number.

Terms of service

U.S. Senate seniority list

See also
107th United States Congress
List of members of the United States House of Representatives in the 107th Congress by seniority

Notes

External links
Senate Seniority List

107
107th United States Congress